Palainiškiai (formerly) is a village in Kėdainiai district municipality, in Kaunas County, in central Lithuania. According to the 2011 census, the village was uninhabited. The Smilga Landscape Sanctuary in located next to Palainiškiai.

At the beginning of the 20th century there was Palainiškiai estate in Josvainiai volost.

Demography

References

Villages in Kaunas County
Kėdainiai District Municipality